Satterfield Motor Company Building is a single-story commercial building at 108 E. Main Street, New Roads, Louisiana.  The building was built in 1918 and backs onto the False River. It was listed on the National Register of Historic Places in 1994.

It was deemed significant in automotive history in the area, as part of introducing the newfangled things. In 1917 it was announced in The Pointe Coupee Banner that Theodore E. Satterfield was appointed agent for the Ford Motor Company, and would open a dealership in "'a splendid brick building on Main Street that will be an ornament to the town.'"  It was apparently the first full automotive dealership in the town with showroom space as well as parts and service departments.

The building was designed by architect Phil B. Seibold in late 1917 and was constructed by contractors Bouanchaud & Herring in 1918.  It is an L-shaped one-story stucco-over-brick building, with shared party walls.  It has three bays on the front divided by piers which rise above a parapet, whose center section has a curved shape.

The NRHP nomination document is silent on how long the dealership operated.  Photos from 1994 show the building vacant, with no sign.    A restaurant named "Satterfield's Upper Deck Restaurant", overlooking False River, was closed in May 2020 due to "coronavirus uncertainty", but the "Landing Bar" downstairs would remain open.

References

Auto dealerships on the National Register of Historic Places
National Register of Historic Places in Pointe Coupee Parish, Louisiana
Commercial buildings completed in 1918
1918 establishments in Louisiana
Ford Motor Company